The 2013–14 Plunket Shield was the 85th season of official First-class cricket in New Zealand. The competition started on 27 October 2013, and finished on 26 February 2014. Canterbury won the tournament for the seventeenth time after a victory against Central Districts in the final round of matches.

Teams

Points distribution 

Batting Bonus Points are awarded in relation to the number of runs scored after 110 overs are bowled in the first innings.

Bowling Bonus Points are awarded in relation to the number of wickets taken after 110 overs are bowled in the first innings.

Points table

Fixtures and results

References

Plunket Shield
2013–14 New Zealand cricket season
Plunket Shield